Aik Thi Rania is a 2017 Pakistani drama serial directed by Abdullah Badini, produced by 7th Sky Entertainment and written by Madiha Shahid. The drama stars Sumbul Iqbal and Syed Jibran in lead roles, and was first aired 3 November on Geo Entertainment, where it aired every Friday at 8:00 P.M.

Storyline
The story revolves around the life of an intelligent, high achiever and passionate young woman, Rania, who becomes the victim of jealousy and is trapped by her classmate Fahad in a fake love so he can divert her from her studies.

Cast
Sumbul Iqbal as Rania
Syed Jibran as Fahad
Manzoor Qureshi as Aftab
Munawar Saeed as Izhar
Madiha Rizvi as Kiran
Fahima Awan as Ayeza
Humaira Bano as Zarina
Jinaan Hussain as Shehzadi
Beena Chaudhary as Tara
Paras Masroor as Ayyaz
Kinza Malik as Kausar
Arsalan Raja as Haris
Mizna Waqas as Salma Aapa
Hannah Hameed as Adil

Soundtrack 

The title song was sung by Ahmed Jahanzeb and Aima Baig. The music was composed by Naved Nashad and the lyrics were penned by Mubashir Hassan.

Reception 
The series was popular and gained high ratings. It was among the top ten dramas of the years in term of TRPs, of the year it was released.

References

Pakistani drama television series
Geo TV original programming
2017 Pakistani television series debuts
2018 Pakistani television series endings
Urdu-language television shows